Ryszard Jaśniewicz (October 15, 1939 – November 4, 2021) was a Polish actor, director, playwright, poet and educator. He worked in Polish drama theaters in Wrocław, Bydgoszcz, Słupsk and most of the time with the Wybrzeże Theater in Gdańsk. In 1999, together with his wife, Gabriela Pewińska-Jaśniewicz, he founded Teatr z Polski 6 (Theater from Poland 6) and staged 17 monodramas. Since 2008, the theater has been working in House of Plague in Gdańsk.

References

External links 
 Ryszard Jaśniewicz [in:] Encyklopedia Teatru Polskiego (Encyclopedia of Polish Theater). Retrieved 15 January 2022.
 Z wielkiej miłości do małego teatru, Encyklopedia Teatru Polskiego (Encyclopedia of Polish Theater). Retrieved 15 January 2022.
 Grażyna Antoniewicz, Budowniczy teatru, który runął. Wspaniała, wzruszająca rola Ryszarda Jaśniewicza, [in:] "Dziennik Bałtycki", September 28, 2021. Retrieved 15 January 2022. 
 Grażyna Antoniewicz, Zmarł trójmiejski aktor Ryszard Jaśniewicz, [in:] "Dziennik Bałtycki", November 5, 2021. Retrieved 15 January 2022. 
 Ryszard Jaśniewicz, aktor, reżyser, pedagog, poeta, Zawsze Pomorze. Retrieved 15 January 2022. 
 Teatr Jaśniewicza, Don Żuan czyli Wielkie Pranie (YouTube). Retrieved 15 January 2022. 
 Pajace (Clowns) art registration, Radio Gdańsk. Retrieved 15 January 2022.
 Ryszard Jaśniewicz, fdb.pl. Retrieved 15 January 2022.

1939 births
2021 deaths
Polish male actors
Polish male stage actors
Polish male television actors
People from Nowogródek Voivodeship (1919–1939)
Recipient of the Meritorious Activist of Culture badge